Eleanor Rae (born 1934) is an American author and proponent of eco-feminism.

Family
Rae was born in Meriden, Connecticut on January 31, 1934. Eleanor was the youngest of four children, her parents Stella Sandj and Jon Pracon immigrated to the United States from Poland. Her parents named here after First Lady Eleanor Roosevelt with the thought that her family would survive the Great Depression. Eleanor Rae is married to Giles Rae and they together have two daughters, a son, and eight grand children.

Education
Rae first earned a Mathematics degree from the College of New Rochelle. She received a Master's degree from Southern Connecticut State University in early childhood education and a Masters in parish ministry and adult education from Fordham University. Rae earned her doctoral degree from Fordham in contemporary systematic theology.
.

Work Life
After her youngest child entered school, Rae worked as a day care worker, parent cooperative nursery school director, in church ministries, and a public school teacher. In her most recent position as Director of Office of the Laity for the Roman Catholic Diocese of Bridgeport CT, she developed an interest in women’s issues and the environment. After seventeen years her controversial and abrupt dismissal from the Diocese led to her founding of the Centre for Women, the Earth, the Divine (CWED). Eleanor also became increasingly involved in The North American Coalition for Christianity and Ecology (NACCE), one of the early organizations in the United States founded to motivate Christians toward eco-logical action, where she was elected president and served as such for several terms.

Major works
Rae co-authored the book Created in Her Image: Models of the Feminine Divine. Beginning in 1995, Rae has published a quarterly newsletter Weaving the Connections on various women’s issues.

Created in Her Image: Models of the Feminine Divine (Summary)
Eleanor Rae uses her feminist perspective, spirituality, and her social concerns to put forth a book that explains the powers of the feminist divine. The book outlines the role that psychology has played in feminism and how it will also play a role going forward.

Women, the Earth, the Divine (Summary)
Rae puts together three topics of concern in this 1994 novel. The novel focuses on rediscovering feminine principle that is a not a result of male view. Instead, Rae uses real world experiences from women. She ties together eco feminism with religion and relates them to real world issues. The novel examines western tendencies to ignore women's voices and peoples ability to over look women's capabilities across various subjects. Rae compares the feminine principle with four major religions, Islam, Buddhism, Hinduism, and Judaism.

Philosophical contributions
Rae is considered a staple in eco feminist theology. She has had a focus on women’s oppression and issues around this subject her entire career. Rae is part of a group of eco feminists that contribute to social in justice and attacks philosophical theories that contribute to injustices. Eco feminism as a whole aims to connect, historically and philosophically, the idea of women’s oppression and nature’s exploitation. 'Rae is credited as one of these eco feminists.

Present
Rae has worked with Amazon river dolphins in Peru and leatherback turtles in Suriname.

Accomplishments
Rae was awarded the Ursula Lauris citation for her leadership achievements.

References

American philosophers